Convoys SL 139/MKS 30 were two Allied convoys which ran during the Battle of the Atlantic in World War II.
SL 139 was one of the SL convoys from the South Atlantic to Britain, and MKS 30 one of the MKS convoys between Britain and the Mediterranean.
They were sailing together on the Gibraltar homeward route, having made a rendezvous off Gibraltar in November 1943.
They were the subject of a major U-boat attack, as part of the Kriegsmarines renewed Autumn offensive.

Background
Following the renewal of the U-boat offensive in the Atlantic, convoys on the   UK/Gibraltar routes, had again come under attack.
German U-boat Control (BdU) had established a patrol line off the coast of Portugal, which had already attacked Allied convoys in October, leading to an inconclusive clash over Convoy SL 138/MKS 28.
In order to maximize the protection for convoys on this route the Admiralty and begun to  run these in tandem, bringing together the South Atlantic and the Mediterranean routes at Gibraltar.

Protagonists
SL 139 left Freetown on 2 November 1943, arriving off Gibraltar on 16 November. It comprised 42 ships and was escorted by an Escort Group, of nine warships.
MKS 30 sailed from Port Said on 2 November, similarly arriving off Gibraltar on 16 November to meet SL 139.
The combined body of 66 ships then sailed for Britain. JS Dalison).

The Schill patrol group, which had been active in this area since October, was now organized into three patrol lines west of Portugal, while aircraft of the Luftwaffe from searched the ocean for any sign of the approaching convoys.
The first, Schill 1, of seven U-boats, was the southernmost rake, running in a  line to the west of Lisbon.

Action
The two convoys made their rendezvous on noon on 16 November 1943, a total of 66 ships initially escorted by 40 EG, seven warships led by Exe.
The combined convoys were sighted by German aircraft on late afternoon of 16 November, southwest of Cape St Vincent, but were able to evade the shadow during the night.

On 18 November the convoys encountered Schill 1'''s patrol line. Meanwhile, further north,  of Schill 2 was caught by an RAF Wellington. She was depth-charged and sunk.,

During the night of 18/19 November, in a series of forays the U-boats tried to penetrate the escort screen, but without success. U-333 was attacked by Exe; she was damaged when she was rammed by Exe and was forced to return to base. Meanwhile, U-515 had attacked and damaged the sloop ; she was forced to drop out, to be towed to the Allied Base in the Azores. Chanticleer survived the .. day journey, and was beached, but was declared unrecoverable.  was counter-attacked, and also forced to retire with damage, leaving U-262 to shadow until Schill 2 could engage.

On 19 November the convoys joined by 5 EG, a Canadian group of  six warships led by British frigate  (Cdr JD Birch) operating in a Support Group role.
Later  on the 19th the convoys were also joined by destroyers Winchelsea and Wrestler, bringing the total escort strength up to nineteen warships.

At dusk on 19 November the convoys encountered Schill 2, which commenced an assault throughout the night of 19/20 November.
Again, they were unable to penetrate the escort screen and during the night  was destroyed by Nene and Snowberry, Canada's first  Support group success.

On 20 November the boats of Schill 2 remained in contact. None of the U-boats were lost or damaged by air attack, but  was caught by Foley and Crane and destroyed.

That night 20/21 November the convoy and pursuing U-boats reached the boats of Schill 3 which joined the fray. Again all attacks were unsuccessful, though no U-boats were destroyed.

On 21 November the convoy was joined by another Support group, 4 EG, comprising six warships led by Bentinck (Cdr EH Chavasse), and by Prince Robert an RCN Armed Merchant Cruiser, fitted out as an AA gunship.

During 21 November BdU called off the U-boat assault, but the convoy was now in range of strike aircraft based in Occupied France.
On the afternoon of 21 November the Luftwaffe launched an attack using its new weapon, the Hs 293 guided missile. Twenty-five He 177's each carrying two Hs 293s took off to attack SL 139/MKS 30. At a distance of several miles the drones were released, to be guided by radio control to their target. Despite AA fire from the escorts, particularly Prince Robert, two ships were hit: Marsa was sunk, Delius, damaged. During this assault two aircraft were forced to return with mechanical trouble, and three others failed to return.

This was the only attempt on the convoy by the Luftwaffe; the convoy continued its voyage without further incident, docking at Liverpool on 26 November 1943.

Aftermath
Despite the concentration of U-boats for this attack, the U-boat Arm failed to make any impact on the convoy. No merchant ships were sunk by the U-boats, though one escort was damaged and subsequently written off, while three U-boats were destroyed.
The Luftwaffe similarly had a disappointing result. Despite their new weapon, of which great things were expected, they saw only one ship sunk and one damaged, for the loss of three aircraft.
For the Allies, their confidence in their ability to protect convoys and destroy attacking U-boats continued, and this was further vindication of the Support Group policy, with no less than three Support Groups able to throw their weight into the conflict.

Notes

References
 Clay Blair : Hitler's U-Boat War [Volume 2]: The Hunted 1942–1945 (1998)  (2000 UK paperback ed.)
 Arnold Hague : The Allied Convoy System 1939–1945 (2000) ISBN (Canada) 1 55125 033 0 :   ISBN (UK) 1 86176 147 3
 Paul Kemp  : U-Boats Destroyed (1997). 
 Stephen Roskill : The War at Sea 1939–1945   Vol III'' (1960). ISBN (none)

External links
 SL 139/MKS 30  at convoyweb

SL139
Naval battles of World War II involving Canada
C